Boris Ivanovich Silayev (born February 28, 1946, in Lyalichi, Mikhaylovsky District, Primorsky Krai) is a former Kyrgyz politician. He is an ethnic Russian. His family moved to the Kyrgyz SSR when he was 10, and he graduated from the Frunze Polytechnic Institute in 1974. He was Mayor of Bishkek from 1995 to 1998. He served as acting Prime Minister of Kyrgyzstan from December 23 to December 25, 1998, and from April 4 to April 13, 1999. He was First Deputy Prime Minister from 1999 to 2000.

Silayev moved to Moscow in 2001 and currently serves as Deputy Director of Department of International Relations in Moscow Government.

References

1946 births
Living people
People from Primorsky Krai
Prime Ministers of Kyrgyzstan
Mayors of Bishkek
Kyrgyz Technical University alumni